Silver Lake is a long and narrow natural freshwater lake on the border between Hernando County, Florida, and Sumter County, Florida. This lake is surrounded by the Withlacoochee State Forest. On the south shore are the Silver Lake Campgrounds. A public boat ramp on the lake shore is within the campgrounds. On the northwest this lake is bounded by Interstate 75. The entire shore of Silver Lake is forested. Sometimes sandbars are nearby. The Withlacoochee River flows into the lake and out the other end.

While this lake has a public boat ramp it has no public swimming beach. There is no information about the types of fish in this lake in online sites.

References

Lakes of Florida